The 1897–1898 Penn State Nittany Lions basketball team represented Penn State University during the 1897–98 college men's basketball season. The team finished with a final record of 2–1.

Schedule

|-

References

Penn State Nittany Lions basketball seasons
Penn State Nittany Lions Basketball Team
Penn State
Penn State Nittany L